Maïté Nahyr (25 October 1947 – 19 August 2012) was a Belgian actress. Nahyr was born in Belgium on Saturday, 25 October 1947. She was raised in Belgium but reportedly was of South American (Paraguayan) descent. She built her professional career in Europe. Her best known film roles included Roman Polanski's 1974 film The Tenant, 1980's City of Women by Federico Fellini, and Boy Meets Girl in 1984.

Nahyr also appeared at the Théâtre National de Chaillot in Paris in 1985, where she appeared in Ubu Roi by Antoine Vitez and La Visite by  Philippe Adrien. Her most recent film roles included Meeting Venus in 1991; Dien Bien Phu, directed by Pierre Schoendoerffer in 1992; and Little Nothings, a 1992 film directed by Cedric Klapisch.

Nahyr died in Marseilles of cancer on Sunday, 19 August 2012, at the age of 64.

Partial filmography

 Le nosferat ou les eaux glacées de calcul égoiste (1974) - Mère / Vierge / Reine
 Calmos (1976) - Une femme soldat
 Je t'aime moi non plus (1976) - La prostituée
 The Tenant (1976) - Lucille
Violette & François (1977)
 Memoirs of a French Whore (1979)
 City of Women (1980) - Feminist (uncredited)
 Le bâtard (1983) - La strip-teaseuse
 Die Olympiasiegerin (1983) - Geschäftsführer
 Boy Meets Girl (1984) - Maite
 Favourites of the Moon (1984) - Madeleine Duphour-Paquet
 Ni avec toi ni sans toi (1985) - Sainte Ricard
  (1986) - Deponiechefin
 Les mois d'avril sont meurtriers (1987) - Jeanne
 Le bal du gouverneur (1990) - Mademoiselle Reiche
 Transit (1991)
 Sushi Sushi (1991) - La femme dépressive
 Meeting Venus (1991) - Maria Krawiecki
 Dien Bien Phu (1992) - L'Eurasienne
 Riens du tout (1992) - La directrice de coordination
 La nuit sacrée (1993) - Assise / consul's sister
 À la mode (1993) - Rivka
 The Smile (1994) - Mado
 Capitaine au long cours (1997) - Maria
 Sur un air d'autoroute (2000) - Mme Sandre

References

External links
 

1947 births
2012 deaths
Belgian film actresses
Belgian stage actresses
Belgian expatriates in France
Deaths from cancer in France